Dawe is a surname. Notable people with the surname include:

Billie Dawe (1924–2013), Canadian ice hockey player
Bruce Dawe, Australian poet
Bryan Dawe, Australian comedian and satirist
Carlton Dawe, author born in Adelaide, Australia
Elle Dawe, Australian actress
George Dawe, English portrait artist 
Gerald Dawe, Northern Irish writer and poet
Jason Dawe (ice hockey), professional ice hockey player
Jason Dawe (television), presenter on the Top Gear television show
Leonard Dawe (1889–1963), English amateur footballer, who later compiled crosswords for the Daily Telegraph newspaper
Nathan Dawe, English DJ and producer
Tom Dawe, writer from Newfoundland and Labrador, Canada

See also
Daw (surname)
Daou (disambiguation)#People, list of people with the surname
Dawes (surname)